This is a list of township-level divisions of the province of Hebei, People's Republic of China (PRC). After province, prefecture, and county-level divisions, township-level divisions constitute the formal fourth-level administrative divisions of the PRC. There are a total of 2,186 such divisions in Hebei, divided into 1 district public office (Nanshan District, Zhuolu County) 241 subdistricts, 939 towns, 954 townships, and 51 ethnic townships, the last type mainly designated for the Hui, Manchu, and/or Mongol ethnic groups. This list is divided first into the prefecture-level cities then the county-level divisions.

Shijiazhuang

Chang'an District
There are 8 subdistricts and 3 towns in Chang'an District.

Subdistricts:

Jianbei Subdistrict, Qingyuan Subdistrict, Guang'an Subdistrict, Yucai Subdistrict, Yuejin Subdistrict, Hedong Subdistrict, Changfeng Subdistrict, Tangu Subdistrict

Towns:
Xizhaotong, Nancun, Gaoying

Gaocheng District
Towns:
Lianzhou, Gangshang, Nandong, Xing'an, Nanmeng, Meihua, Chang'an, Zengcun, Xiguan, Zhangjiazhuang, Jiashizhuang, Qiutou, Nanying

Townships:
Jiumen Hui Ethnic Township

Jingxing Mining District
Subdistricts:
Kuangshi Subdistrict, Siwei Subdistrict

Towns:
Jiazhuang, Fengshan

The only township is Hengjian

Qiaodong District, Shijiazhuang
Subdistricts:
East Zhongshan Road Subdistrict, Penghou Subdistrict, Dongfeng Subdistrict, Donghua Subdistrict, Xiumen Subdistrict, Fukang Subdistrict, Jian'an Subdistrict, Shengli North Subdistrict, Huitong Subdistrict

The only town is Taoyuan

Qiaoxi District, Shijiazhuang
Subdistricts:
Dongli Subdistrict, Zhongshan Road Subdistrict, Nanchang Subdistrict, Weiming Subdistrict, Yuxi Subdistrict, Youyi Subdistrict, Hongqi Subdistrict, Xinshi Subdistrict, Yuandong Subdistrict, Xili Subdistrict, Zhentou Subdistrict

The only township is Liuying Township

Xinhua District, Shijiazhuang
Subdistricts:
Gexin Subdistrict, Xinhua Road Subdistrict, Ning'an Subdistrict, Dongjiao Subdistrict, Xiyuan Subdistrict, Hezuo Road Subdistrict, Lianmeng Subdistrict, Shigang Subdistrict, Wuqi Subdistrict, Tianyuan Subdistrict, Beiyuan Subdistrict

Towns:
Daguo, Zhaolingpuxi

Townships:
Sanzhuang Township, Dubei Township

Yuhua District
Subdistricts
Yuxing Subdistrict, Yuqiang Subdistrict, Dongyuan Subdistrict, Jiantong Subdistrict, Huaidi Subdistrict, Yuhua Road Subdistrict, Yudong Subdistrict, Changjiang Subdistrict, Taihang Subdistrict

Towns:
Songying, Fangcun

Jinzhou
Towns: 
Jinzhou, Zongshizhuang, Yingli, Taoyuan, Dongzhuosu, Mayu, Xiaoqiao, Huaishu, Donglizhuang

The only township is Zhoujiazhuang Township

Luquan
Towns:
Huailu, Tongye, Sijiazhuang, Shangzhuang, Licun, Yi'an, Huangbizhuang, Dahe, Shanyincun

Townships:
Shijing Township, Bailuquan Township, Shangzhai Township

Xinji
Towns:
Xinji, Zhangguzhuang, Weibo, Jiucheng, Xinleitou, Xincheng, Nanzhiqiong, Wangkou

Townships:
Xiaoxinzhuang Township, Zhonglixiang Township, Tiangongying Township, Qianying Township, Hemujing Township, Tianjiazhuang Township, Mazhuang Township

Xinle City
Subdistricts:
Changshou Subdistrict

Towns:
Cheng'an, Hantai, Dongwang, Matoupu, Zhengmo, Dugu, Nandayue, Huapi

Townships:
Xieshen Township, Mucun Township, Pengjiazhuang Hui Ethnic Township

Gaoyi County
Towns:
Gaoyi, Daying, Fucun

Townships:
Zhonghan Township, Wancheng Township,

Jingxing County
Towns:
Weishui, Shang'an, Tianchang, Xiulin, Nanyu, Weizhou, Xiaozuo, Nanzhangcheng, Cangyanshan, Ceyu

Townships:
Wujiayao Township, Beizheng Township, Yujia Township, Sunzhuang Township, Nanxing Township, Xinzhuang Township, Nanwangzhuang Township

Lingshou County
Towns:
Lingshou, Qingtong, Tashang, Ciyu, Chatou, Chenzhuang

Townships:
Sanshengyuan Township, Beiwa Township, Niucheng Township, Goutai Township, Nanzhai Township, Beitanzhuang Township, Zhaitou Township, Nanying Township, Nanyanchuan Township

Luancheng County
Towns:
Luancheng, Qiema, Yehe, Douyu, Loudi

Townships:
Nangao Township, Liulintun Township, Xiying Township

Pingshan County
Towns:
Pingshan, Donghuishe, Wentang, Nandian, Gangnan, Zhongguyue, Xiahuai, Mengjiazhuang, Xiaojue, Jiaotanzhuang, Xibaipo, Xiakou

Townships:
Xidawu Township, Shangsanji Township, Lianghe Township, Dongwangpo Township, Sujiazhuang Township, Zhaibei Township, Beiye Township, Shangguanyintang Township, Yangjiaqiao Township, Yingli Township, Hehekou Township

Shenze County
Towns:
Shenze, Tiegan

Townships:
Baizhuang Township, Liucun Township, Zhaoba Township, Qiaotou Township

Wuji County
Towns:
Wuji, Zhangduangu, Beisu, Qiji, Guozhuang, Dachen

Townships:
Donghoufang Township, Haozhuang Township, Lichengdao Township Nanliu Township, Gaotou Hui Ethnic Township

Xingtang County
Towns:
Longzhou, Nanqiao, Shangbei, Koutou

Townships:
Duyanggang Township, Anxiang Township, Zhili Township, Shitong Township, Diying Township, Chengzhai Township, Shangfang Township, Yuting Township, Beihe Township, Shangyanzhuang Township, Jiukouzi Township

Yuanshi County
The only subdistrict is Chengqu Subdistrict

Towns:
Huaiyang, Nanyin, Nanzuo, Yincun, Jicun, Songcao

Townships:
Dongzhang Township, Zhaotong Township, Macun Township, Beichu Township, Suyang Township, Sucun Township, Beizheng Township, Qianxian Township, Heishuihe Township

Zanhuang County
Towns:
Zanhuang, Yuantou

Townships:
Nanxingguo Township, Nanqinghe Township, Xiyangze Township, Huangbeiping Township, Xuting Township, Zhangshiyan Township, Zhangleng Township, Xilongmen Township, Tumen Township

Zhao County
Towns:
Zhaozhou, Fanzhuang, Beiwangli, Xinzhaidian, Hancun, Nanbaishe, Shahedian

Townships:
Qiandazhang Township, Xiezhuang Township, Gaocun Township, Wangxizhang Township

Zhengding County
Towns:
Zhengding, Zhufutun, Xin'an, Xinchengpu

Townships:
Xipingle Township, Nanniu Township, Nanlou Township, Beizaoxian Township, Quyangqiao Township

Baoding

Beishi District
Subdistricts:
Hepingli Subdistrict, Wusi Road Subdistrict, Xiguan Subdistrict, Zhonghua Road Subdistrict, Dongguan Subdistrict

Townships:
Hanzhuang Township, Dongjinzhuang Township, Bailou Township

Nanshi District
Subdistricts:
Lianmeng Subdistrict, Hongxing Subdistrict, Yuhua Subdistrict, Yonghua Subdistrict, Nanguan Subdistrict

Townships:
Nandayuan Township, Jiaozhuang Township, Yangzhuang Township, Wuyao Township

Xinshi District
Subdistricts:
Xuanfeng Subdistrict, Xinshichang Subdistrict, Dongfeng Subdistrict, South Jianshe Road Subdistrict, North Hancun Road Subdistrict

Townships:
Jiezhuang Township, Fuchang Township, Hancun Township, Nanqi Township, Jiangcheng Township, Damafang Township

Anguo
Subdistricts:
Qizhouyaoshi Subdistrict

Towns:
Qizhou, Wurenqiao, Shifo, Zhengzhang, Xifoluo, Dawunü

Townships:
Mingguandian Township, Nanloudi Township, Xi'anguocheng Township, Beiduancun Township

Dingzhou
Towns:
Qingfengdian, Dongting, Liqingu, Mingyuedian, Daxinzhuang, Xingyi, Zhuanlu, Liuzao, Pangcun, Gaopeng, Ziwei, Dingningdian, Dongwang, Kaiyuan

Townships:
Dongliuchun Township, Zhoucun Township, Daluzhuang Township, Yangjiazhuang Township, Zhaocun Township, Xicheng Township, Xizhong Township, Haotouzhuang Hui Ethnic Township

Gaobeidian
Subdistricts:
Heping Subdistrict, Juncheng Subdistrict, Dongsheng Subdistrict, Beicheng Subdistrict, Xinghua Road Subdistrict

Towns:
Fangguan, Xincheng, Sizhuang, Baigou, Xinlizhuang

Townships:
Xiaoguanying Township, Liangjiaying Township, Zhangliuzhuang Township, Dongmaying Township, Xinqiao Township

Zhuozhou
Subdistricts:
Shuangta Subdistrict, Taoyuan Subdistrict, Qingliangsi Subdistrict

Towns:
Songlindian, Matou, Dongchengfang, Gaoguanzhuang, Dongxianpo, Baichigan

Townships:
Yihezhuang Township, Lintun Township, Sunzhuang Township, Douzhuang Township, Diaowo Township

Anxin County
Towns:
Anxin Town, Dawang, Santai, Duancun, Zhaobeikou, Tongkou, Liulizhuang, Anzhou, Laohetou

Townships:
Quantou Township, Zhaili Township, Luzhuang Township

Boye County
Towns:
Boye Town, Xiaodian, Chengwei

Townships:
Dongxu Township, Beiyangcun Township, Chengdong Township, Nanxiaowang Township

Dingxing County
Towns:
Dingxing Town, Gucheng, Xianyu, Beihe, Tiangongsi

Townships:
Dongluobao Township, Gaoli Township, Zhangjiazhuang Township, Yaocun Township, Xiaocun Township, Liudiao Township, Yangcun Township, Beitian Township, Beinancai Township, Liyuzhuang Township, Xiaozhuzhuang Township

Fuping County
Towns:
Fuping, Longquanguan, Pingyang, Chengnanzhuang, Tianshengqiao

Townships:
Wanglinkou Township, Taiyu Township, Datai Township, Shijiazhai Township, Shawo Township, Wuwangkou Township, Xiazhuang Township, Beiguoyuan Township

Gaoyang County
Towns:
Gaoyang, Pangkou, Xiyan, Xingjianan

Townships:
Jinzhuang Township, Pukou Township, Xiaowangguozhuang Township, Longhua Township, Pangjiazhuang Township

Laishui County
Towns:
Laishui Town, Yi'an, Shiting, Zhaogezhuang, Yongyang, Sanpo, Jiulong

Townships:
Longmen Township, Qizhongkou Township, Songgezhuang Township, Hujiazhuang Township, Mingyi Township, Wangcun Township, Dongwenshan Township, Loucun Manchu Ethnic Township

Laiyuan County
Towns:
Laiyuan, Yinfang, Zoumayi, Shuibao, Wang'an, Yangjiazhuang, Baishishan

Townships:
Nandun Township, Nanmazhuang Township, Beishifo Township, Jinjiajing Township, Liujiazhuang Township, Shangzhuang Township, Dongtuanbao Township, Tayayi Township, Wulonggou Township, Yanmeidong Township

Li County
Towns:
Liwu, Liushi, Dabaichi, Xinxing, Beiguodan, Wan'an, Sangyuan, Nanzhuang

Townships:
Xiaochen Township, Linbao Township, Beiniantou Township, Baoxu Township, Daquti Township

Mancheng County
Subdistricts:
Huiyang Subdistrict

Towns:
Mancheng Town, Daceying, Shenxing, Nanhancun, Fangshunqiao

Townships:
Yujiazhuang Township, Xiantai Township, Yaozhuang Township, Bailong Township, Shijing Township, Tuonan Township, Liujiatai Township

Qingyuan County
Towns:
Qingyuan, Ranzhuang, Yangcheng, Weicun, Wenren, Zhangdeng, Dazhuang, Zangcun

Townships:
Baituan Township, Beidian Township, Shiqiao Township, Lizhuang Township, Beiwangli Township, Donglü Township, Heqiao Township, Suncun Township, Yanzhuang Township, Wangting Township

Quyang County
Towns:
Hengzhou, Lingshan, Yanzhao, Yangping, Wende

Townships:
Luzhuangzi Township, Xiahe Township, Zhuangke Township, Xiaomu Township, Dongwang Township, Xiaolin Township, Dicun Township, Chande Township, Qicun Township, Dangcheng Township, Langjiazhuang Township, Fanjiazhuang Township, Beitai Township

Rongcheng County
Towns:
Rongcheng, Xiaoli, Nanzhang, Dahe, Liangmatai

Townships:
Bayu Township, Jiaguang Township, Pingwang Township

Shunping County
Towns:
Puyang, Gaoyupu, Yaoshan

Townships:
Pushang Township, Baiyun Township, Hekou Township, Anyang Township, Taiyu Township, Dabei Township, Shennan Township

Tang County
Towns:
Renhou, Wangjing, Gaochang, Beiluo, Baihe, Juncheng, Chuanli

Townships:
Changgucheng Township, Duting Township, Nandiantou Township, Beidiantou Township, Luozhuang Township, Baoshui Township, Dayang Township, Micheng Township, Qijiazhuang Township, Yangjiao Township, Shimen Township, Huangshikou Township, Daomaguan Township

Wangdu County
Towns:
Wangdu Town, Gudian

Townships:
Sizhuang Township, Zhaozhuang Township, Heibao Township, Gaoling Township, Zhonghanzhuang Township, Jiacun Township

Xiong County
Towns:
Xiongzhou, Zangang, Daying

Townships:
Longwan Township, Zhugezhuang Township, Mijiawu Township, Shuangtang Township, Zhanggang Township, Beishakou Township

Xushui County
Towns:
Ansu, Cuizhuang, Dayin, Suicheng, Gaolincun, Dawangdian, Caohe

Townships:
Dongshiduan Township, Liucun Township, Zhengcun Township, Humi Township, Puhe Township, Dongfushan Township, Yilianzhuang Township

Yi County
Towns:
Yizhou, Luangezhuang, Xiling, Peishan, Tanghu, Langyashan, Lianggang, Zijingguan

Townships:
Qiaotou Township, Baima Township, Liujing Township, Gaocun Township, Gaomo Township, Dalonghua Township, Angezhuang Township, Xishanbei Township, Weidu Township, Dule Township, Qiyu Township, Fugang Township, Pocang Township, Niugang Township, Qiaojiahe Township, Ganhejing Township, Caijiayu Township, Nanchengsi Township, Lingyunce Hui and Manchu Ethnic Township

Cangzhou

Xinhua District, Cangzhou
Subdistricts:
North Jianshe Avenue Subdistrict, Chezhan Subdistrict, Nanda Avenue Subdistrict, Donghuan Subdistrict, Daodong Subdistrict

The only township is Xiaozhaozhuang Township

Yunhe District
Subdistricts:
Shuiyuesi Subdistrict, Central Nanhuan Road Subdistrict, Nanhu Subdistrict, Shichang Subdistrict, Central Xihuan Avenue Subdistrict, Gongyuan Subdistrict

The only town is Xiaowangzhuang, and the only township is Nanchentun Township

Botou
Subdistricts:
Jiefang Subdistrict, Hedong Subdistrict, Gulou Subdistrict

Towns:
Bozhen, Jiaohe, Qiqiao, Simencun, Haocun, Fuzhen, Wenmiao, Waliwang

Townships:
Wangwuzhuang Township, Yingzi Township, Siying Township, Xixindian Township

Hejian

Huanghua
Subdistricts:
Huazhong Subdistrict, Huadong Subdistrict, Huaxi Subdistrict

Towns:
Huanghua, Huanghua, Nanpaihe, Jiucheng, Lüqiao

Townships:
Guanzhuang Township, Changguo Township, Qijiawu Township, Tengzhuangzi Township, Yang'erzhuang Hui Ethnic Township, Xincun Hui Ethnic Township, Yangsanmu Hui Ethnic Township

Renqiu
Subdistricts:
Xinhua Road Subdistrict, Xihuan Road Subdistrict, Yongfeng Road Subdistrict

Towns:
Chu'an, Shimenqiao, Lübaogong, Changfeng, Mofuzhou, Gougezhuang, Liangzhao, Xinzhongyi

Townships:
Yilunbao Township, Qingta Township, Beixinzhuang Township, Qijianfang Township, Beihan Township, Yucun Township, Majiawu Township

Cang County
Towns:
Xingji, Jiuzhou, Dusheng, Cui'erzhuang

Townships:
Zhangguantun Township, Wangjiapu Township, Wulongtang Township, Liujiamiao Township, Fenghuadian Township, Yaoguantun Township, Daguanting Township, Gaochuan Township, Huangdipu Township, Zhifangtou Township, Xueguantun Township, Jiedi Hui Ethnic Township, Dulin Hui Ethnic Township, Litianmu Hui Ethnic Township, Dazhecun Hui Ethnic Township

Dongguang County
Towns:
Dongguang, Lianzhen, Zhaowang, Qincun, Dengmingsi, Nanxiakou, Dadan

Townships:
Longwali Township, Yuqiao Township

Haixing County
Towns:
Suji, Xinji, Gaowan

Townships:
Zhaomaotao Township, Xiangfang Township, Xiaoshan Township, Zhanghuiting Township

Mengcun Hui Autonomous County
Towns:
Mengcun, Xinxian, Xindian, Gaozhai

Townships:
Songzhuangzi Township, Niujinzhuang Township

Nanpi County
Towns:
Nanpi, Fengjiakou, Zhaizi, Baoguantun, Wangsi, Wumaying

Townships:
Dalangdian Township, Liubali Township, Luguan Township

Qing County
Towns:
Qingzhou, Jinniu, Xinxing, Liuhe, Mumendian, Machang

Townships:
Zhouguantun Township, Caosi Township, Pangu Township, Chenzui Township

Suning County
Towns:
Suning, Liangjiacun, Wobei, Shangcun, Wanli

Townships:
Shisuo Township, Hebeiliushansi Township, Fujiazuo Township, Shaozhuang Township

Wuqiao County
Towns:
Sangyuan, Tiecheng, Yuji, Liangji, Anling

Townships:
Caojiawa Township, Songmen Township, Yangjiasi Township, Goudianpu Township, Hezhuang Township

Xian County
Towns:
Leshou, Huaizhen, Guozhuang, Hechengjie, Hancun, Monan, Chenzhuang

Townships:
Xuliugao Township, Shanglin Township, Duancun Township, Zhangcun Township, Linhe Township, Xiaopingwang Township, Shiwuji Township, Leitou Township, Nanhetou Township, Xicheng Township, Benzhai Hui Ethnic Township

Yanshan County
Towns:
Yanshan, Wangshu, Hanji, Shengfo, Qingyun, Qiantong

Townships:
Bianwu Township, Xiaoying Township, Mengdian Township, Xiaozhuang Township, Yangji Township, Changzhuang Township

Chengde

Shuangluan District
Subdistricts:
Yuanbaoshan Subdistrict, Gangcheng Subdistrict

Towns:
Shuangtashan, Luanhe, Damiao, Pianqiaozi

Townships:
Chenzhazi Township, Xidi Manchu Ethnic Township

Shuangqiao District
Subdistricts:
Xida Avenue Subdistrict, Toudaopailou Subdistrict, Panjiagou Subdistrict, Zhonghua Road Subdistrict, Xinhua Road Subdistrict, Shidongzigou Subdistrict, Qiaodong Subdistrict

Towns:
Shuiquangou, Shizigou, Niuquanzigou, Dashimiao, Fengyingzi

Yingshouyingzi Mining District
Towns:
Wangjiazhuang, Yingshouyingzi Town, Shouwangfen, Beimaquanzi

Chengde County
Towns:
Xiabancheng, Shangbancheng, Jiashan, Liugou, Sangou, Tougou, Gaositai, Shuangfengsi

Townships:
Dongxiaobaiqi Township, Anjiang Township, Liuzhangzi Township, Xinzhangzi Township, Mengjiayuan Township, Dayingzi Township, Bajia Township, Shanggu Township, Manzhangzi Township, Shihuiyao Township, Wudaohe Township, Chagou Township, Dengshan Township, Sanjia Township, Cangzi Township, Gangzi Manchu Ethnic Township, Liangjia Manchu Ethnic Township

Fengning Manchu Autonomous County
Towns:
Dage, Datan, Yu'ershan, Tucheng, Huangqi, Fengshan, Boluonuo, Heishanju, Tianqiao

Townships:
Wanshengyong Township, Sichakou Township, Sujiadian Township, Waigoumen Township, Caoyuan Township, Kulongshan Township, Xiaobazi Township, Wudaoying Township, Xuanjiangying Township, Xiguanying Township, Wangying Township, Beitouying Township, Hulinying Township, Shirengou Township, Tanghe Township, Yangmuzhazi Township, Nanguan Mongol Ethnic Township

Kuancheng Manchu Autonomous County
Towns:
Kuancheng, Longxumen, Yu'erya, Bancheng, Tangdaohe, Boluotai, Nianziyu

Townships:
Huapiliuzi Township, Tashan Township, Mengziling Township, Dushigou Township, Dongdadi Township, Huajian Township, Donghuanghuachuan Township, Liangjiatai Township, Weizigou Township, Dazigoumen Township, Dashizhuzi Township

Longhua County
Towns:
Longhua, Hanmaying, Zhongguan, Qijia, Tangtougou, Zhangsanying, Tangsanying, Lanqi, Bugugou, Guojiatun

Townships:
Huangdi Township, Zhangjiying Township, Maojingba Township, Shanwan Township, Jianfang Township, Hanjiadian Township, Wangoumen Township, Yinjiaying Manchu Ethnic Township, Miaozigou Mongol and Manchu Ethnic Township, Pianpoying Manchu Ethnic Township, Badaying Mongol Ethnic Township, Taipingzhuang Manchu Ethnic Township, Jiutun Manchu Ethnic Township, Xi'achao Manchu and Mongol Ethnic Township, Baihugou Manchu and Mongol Ethnic Township

Luanping County
The only subdistrict is Zhongxing Road Subdistrict

Towns:
Luanping, Changshanyu, Hongqi, Jingoutun, Hushiha, Bakeshiying, Zhangbaiwan

Townships:
Fuyingzi Township, Huodoushan Township, Liangjianfang Township, Laowa Township, Pingfang Manchu Ethnic Township, Anchungoumen Manchu Ethnic Township, Xiaoying Manchu Ethnic Township, Xigou Manchu Ethnic Township, Dengchang Manchu Ethnic Township, Wudaoyingzi Manchu Ethnic Township, Mayingzi Ethnic Township, Fujiadian Manchu Ethnic Township, Datun Manchu Ethnic Township

Pingquan County
Towns:
Pingquan, Huangtuliangzi, Yushulinzi, Yangshuling, Qigou, Xiaosigou, Dangba, Wolong, Nanwudajiazi, Beiwudajiazi

Townships:
Wangtufang Township, Taitoushan Township, Songshutai Township, Daohugou Township, Liuxi Manchu Ethnic Township, Qijiadai Manchu Ethnic Township, Pingfang Manchu and Mongol Ethnic Township, Maolangou Manchu and Mongol Ethnic Township, Guozhangzi Manchu Ethnic Township

Weichang Manchu and Mongol Autonomous County
Towns:
Weichang, Siheyong, Kelegou, Qipanshan, Banjieta, Chaoyangdi, Chaoyangwan

Townships:
Daobazi Township, Longtoushan Township, Yaozhan Township, Huangtukan Township, Sidaogou Township, Lanqikalun Township, Yinwogou Township, Xindi Township, Guangfayong Township, Yutaihe Township, Guojiawan Township, Yangjiawan Township, Dahuanqi Township, Haliha Township, Xinbo Township, Zhangjiawan Township, Baoyuanzhan Township, Shanwanzi Township, Sanyiyong Township, Jiangjiadian Township, Xiahuofang Township, Yangebai Township, Pailou Township, Chengzi Township, Laowopu Township, Yudaokou Township, Shizhuozi Township, Datoushan Township, Nanshanzui Township, Xilongtou Township

Xinglong County
Towns:
Xinglong, Liudaohe, Gualanyu, Banbishan, Ping'anbao, Beiyingfang, Qingsongling, Gushanzi, Lanqiying

Townships:
Xiataizi Township, Dazhangzi Township, Beishuiquan Township, Douziyu Township, Sandaohe Township, Dashuiquan Township, Moguyu Township, Shangshidong Township, Anziling Township, Nantian Manchu Ethnic Township, Bagualing Manchu Ethnic Township

Handan

Congtai District
Subdistricts:
Renmin Road Subdistrict, Zhonghua Subdistrict, East Congtai Subdistrict, West Congtai Subdistrict, Guangmingqiao Subdistrict, Qinhe Subdistrict, Heping Subdistrict, Liulinqiao Subdistrict, East Lianfang Subdistrict, West Lianfang Subdistrict

The only township is Sucao Township.

Fengfeng Mining District
Towns:
Linshui, Fengfeng Town, Xinpo, Dashe, Hecun, Yijing, Pengcheng, Jiecheng, Dayu

Fuxing District
Subdistricts: 
Shengliqiao Subdistrict, Pangcun Subdistrict, Tieludayuan Subdistrict, Shihua Subdistrict, Hualin Road Subdistrict, Erliuqisan Subdistrict, Baijiacun Subdistrict

The only township is Pengjiazhai Township

Hanshan District
Subdistricts: 
Huomo Subdistrict, Lingyuan Road Subdistrict, Guangming Road Subdistrict, Fudong Subdistrict, Luochengtou Subdistrict, Zhuhe Road Subdistrict, Yuxinnan Subdistrict, Nonglin Road Subdistrict, Maodong Subdistrict, Maoxi Subdistrict

Towns: 
Matou, Beizhangzhuang

The only township is Mazhuang Township

Wu'an
Towns: 
Wu'an Town, Kang'ercheng, Niuji, Cishan, Boyan, Shucun, Datong, Yicheng, Kuangshan, Hejin, Yangyi, Paihui, Yetao

Townships:
Shangtuancheng Township, Bei'anzhuang Township, Bei'anle Township, Xitushan Township, Xisizhuang Township, Huoshui Township, Shidong Township, Guantao Township, Majiazhuang Township

Cheng'an County
Towns:
Cheng'an, Shangcheng, Zhanghedian, Lijiatuan

Townships:
Xinyi Township, Baisiying Township, Daodongbao Township, Beixiangyi Township, Changxiang Township

Ci County
Towns:
Cizhou, Xiguanglu, Gaoyu, Yuecheng, Guantai, Lintan, Huangsha, Baitu, Jiangwucheng

Townships:
Lucunying Township, Guyi Township, Xinzhuangying Township, Huaguanying Township, Shicunying Township, Nancheng Township, Taicheng Township, Taoquan Township, Dudang Township, Jiabi Township

Daming County
Towns:
Daming, Yangqiao, Wanti, Longwangmiao, Shuguan, Jintan

Townships:
Shageta Township, Wangcun Township, Pushang Township, Huangjinti Township, Dajie Township, Jiuye Township, Ximuzhuang Township, Sungandian Township, Xifuji Township, Niantou Township, Beifeng Township, Zhangji Township, Hongmiao Township, Yingzhen Hui Ethnic Township

Feixiang County
Towns:
Feixiang, Tiantaishan

Townships:
Daxihan Township, Xin'anzhen Township, Maoyanbao Township, Yuangu Township, Tunzhuangying Township, Dongzhangbao Township, Jiudian Township

Guangping County
Towns:
Guangping, Pinggudian, Shengying

Townships:
Dongzhangmeng Township, Shilipu Township, Nanyangbao Township, Nanhancun Township

Guantao County
Towns:
Guantao, Weisengzhai, Fangzhai, Zibao

Townships:
Nanxucun Township, Luqiao Township, Wangqiao Township, Shoushansi Township

Handan County
Towns:
Hucun, Beizhangzhuang, Shangbi, Heshazhen, Huangliangmeng

Townships:
Sanling Township, Daizhao Township, Nanlügu Township, Nanbao Township, Jianzhuang Township, Kangzhuang Township

Jize County
Towns:
Jize, Xiaozhai, Shuangta

Townships:
Fengzheng Township, Wuguanying Township, Futudian Township, Caozhuang Township

Linzhang County
Towns:
Linzhang, Nandongfang, Suntaoji, Liuyuan, Chenggouji

Townships:
Diqiu Township, Zhangcunji Township, Xiyanggao Township, Xiangcaiying Township, Ducunji Township, Zhangliji Township, Xiwen Township, Zhuanzhaiying Township, Baiheji Township

Qiu County
Towns:
Xinmatou, Qiucheng

Townships:
Danzhai Township, Nanxindian Township, Xiangchenggu Township, Liang'erzhuang Township, Chencun Hui Ethnic Township

Quzhou County
Towns:
Hebei, Anzhai, Henantuan, Houcun, Disituan

Townships:
Dahedao Township, Baizhai Township, Yizhuang Township, Nanliyue Township, Huaiqiao Township

She County
Towns:
Shecheng, Guxin, Henandian, Gengle, Xida, Xixu, Suobao, Jiangdian, Piancheng

Townships:
Mujing Township, Longhu Township, Liaocheng Township, Guanfang Township, Hezhang Township, Shentou Township, Piandian Township, Lutou Township

Wei County, Handan
Towns:
Weicheng, Dezheng, Huilong, Beiyao, Shuangjing, Yali, Chewang

Townships:
Damacun Township, Daxinzhuang Township, Damo Township, Dongdaigu Township, Beitaitou Township, Renwangji Township, Bianma Township, Shakouji Township, Jizhenzhai Township, Yehuguai Township, Yuanbao Township, Nanshuangmiao Township, Bokou Township, Zhang'erzhuang Township

Yongnian County
Towns:
Linluoguan, Dabeiwang, Guangfu, Yonghehui, Nanyancun, Zhangxibao

Townships:
Xiaolongma Township, Xiaoxibao Township, Zhengxi Township, Dongyangzhuang Township, Xiyangcheng Township, Xisu Township, Xihezhuang Township, Qumo Township, Liuhan Township, Jiangwu Township, Liuying Township, Xinzhuangbao Township, Jiehedian Township, Yaozhai Township

Hengshui

Taocheng District
Subdistricts:
Hexi Subdistrict, Hedong Subdistrict, Lubei Subdistrict, Zhonghua Subdistrict

Towns:
Zhengjiaheyan, Zhaoquan

Townships:
Hejiazhuang Township, Damasen Township, Dengzhuang Township, Pengducun Township

Jizhou
Towns:
Jizhou Town, Weijiatun, Guandaoli, Nanwucun, Zhoucun, Matouli, Xiwangzhuang

Townships:
Menjiazhuang Township, Xujiazhuang Township, Beizhanghuai Township, Xiaozhai Township

Shenzhou City
Towns:
Tangfeng, Shenzhou Town, Chenshi, Yuke, Weiqiao, Dadi, Qianmotou, Wangjiajing, Hujiachi

Townships:
Bingcao Township, Mucun Township, Dong'anzhuang Township, Beixicun Township, Dafengying Township, Qiaotun Township, Taiguzhuang Township, Datun Township

Anping County
Towns:
Anping, Madian, Nanwangzhuang

Townships:
Dahezhuang Township, Chengyouzi Township, Xiliangwa Township, Daziwen Township, Donghuangcheng Township

Fucheng County
Towns:
Fucheng, Gucheng, Matou, Xiakou, Cuijiamiao

Townships:
Manhe Township, Jianqiao Township, Jiangfang Township, Dabai Township, Wangji Township

Gucheng County
Towns:
Zhengjiakou, Xiazhuang, Qinghan, Gucheng, Wuguanzhai, Raoyangdian, Juntun, Jianguo, Xibantun

Townships:
Xinzhuang Township, Lilao Township, Fangzhuang Township, Sanlang Township

Jing County
Towns:
Jingzhou, Longhua, Guangchuan, Jing County, Jiangheliu, Anling, Duqiao, Wangqiansi, Beiliuzhi, Liuzhimiao

Townships:
Liuji Township, Lianzhen Township, Liangji Township, Wencheng Township, Houliumingfu Township, Qinglan Township

Raoyang County
Towns:
Raoyang, Dayincun, Wusong, Daguanting

Townships:
Wangtongyue Township, Liuchu Township, Dongliman Township

Wuqiang County
Towns:
Wuqiang, Jieguan, Zhouwo

Townships:
Doucun Township, Beidai Township, Sunzhuang Township

Wuyi County
Towns:
Wuyi, Qingliangdian, Shenpo, Zhaoqiao, Hanzhuang, Xiaoqiaotou

Townships:
Longdian Township, Quantou Township, Dazita Township

Zaoqiang County
Towns:
Zaoqiang, Encha, Daying, Jiahui, Matun, Xiaozhang

Townships:
Zhangxiutun Township, Xintun Township, Wangjun Township, Tanglin Township, Wangchang Township

Langfang

Anci District
Subdistricts:
South Yinhe Road Subdistrict, West Guangming Street Subdistrict, Yonghua Street Subdistrict

Towns:
Luofa, Matou, Geyucheng, Donggugang

Townships:
Yangshuiwu Township, Qiuzhuang Township, Diaohetou Township, Beishijiawu Township

Guangyang District
Subdistricts;
North Yinhe Road Subdistrict, East Aimin Street Subdistrict, Jiefang Street Subdistrict, Xinkai Road Subdistrict, Xinyuan Street Subdistrict

Towns:
Nanjianta, Wanzhuang, Jiuzhou

The only township is Beiwang Township

Bazhou
Towns:
Bazhou, Nanmeng, Xin'an, Tang'erli, Jianchapu, Shengfang, Yangfengang

Townships:
Chaheji Township, Kangxianzhuang Township, Dongyangzhuang Township, Wangzhuangzi Township, Dongduan Township

Sanhe
Towns:
Juyang, Liqizhuang, Yangzhuang, Huangzhuang, Xinji, Duanjialing, Huangshizhuang, Gaolou, Qixinzhuang, Yanjiao

Dachang Hui Autonomous County
Towns:
Dachang, Xiadian, Qigezhuang

Townships:
Shaofu Township, Chenfu Township

Dacheng County
Towns:
Pingshu, Wangcun, Dashangtun, Nanzhaofu, Liugezhuang, Quancun, Litan

Townships:
Beiwei Township, Daguang'an Township, Zangtun Township

Gu'an County
Towns:
Gu'an, Gongcun, Liuquan, Niutuo, Mazhuang

Townships:
Dongwan Township, Pengcun Township, Qugou Township, Lirangdian Township

Wen'an County
Towns:
Wen'an, Xinzhen, Suqiao, Daliuhe, Zuogezhuang, Tanli, Shigezhuang, Zhaogezhuang, Xinglonggong, Daliuzhen, Sunshi, Degui

The only township is Daweihe Hui and Manchu Ethnic Township

Xianghe County
Towns:
Shuyang, Jiangxintun, Qukou, Antoutun, Anping, Liusong, Wubaihu

Townships:
Qianwang Township, Qiantun Township

Yongqing County
The only subdistrict Yongqingxian Subdistrict

Towns:
Yongqing, Hancun, Houyi, Bieguzhuang, Lilancheng

Townships:
Caojiawu Township, Longhuzhuang Township, Liujie Township, Sanshengkou Township, Guanjiawu Hui Ethnic Township

Qinhuangdao

Beidaihe District
Subdistricts:
Xishan Subdistrict, Dongshan Subdistrict

Towns:
Haibin, Daihe

Haigang District
Subdistricts:
Wenhua Road Subdistrict, Haibin Road Subdistrict, Beihuan Road Subdistrict, Jianshe Avenue Subdistrict, Hedong Subdistrict, Xigang Road Subdistrict, Yanshan Avenue Subdistrict, Gangcheng Avenue Subdistrict, Donghuan Road Subdistrict, Baitaling Subdistrict, Qinhuangdao Economic and Technological Development Zone Zhujiang Street Subdistrict, Huanghe Street Subdistrict, Tengfei Road Subdistrict

Towns:
Donggang, Haigang Town, Xigang, Haiyang, Beigang

Shanhaiguan District
Subdistricts:
Nanguan Subdistrict, Dongjie Subdistrict, Xijie Subdistrict, Lunan Subdistrict, Chuanchang Road Subdistrict

Towns:
Diyiguan, Shihe, Mengjiang

Townships:
Bohai Township

Changli County
Towns:
Changli, Jing'an, Anshan, Longjiadian, Nijing, Dapuhe, Xinji, Liutaizhuang, Ruhe, Zhugezhuang, Huangtianzhuang

Townships:
Tuanlin Township, Getiaogang Township, Matuodian Township, Liangshan Township, Shilipu Township

Funing County
Subdistricts:
Licheng Subdistrict, Nandaihe Subdistrict

Towns:
Funing, Liushouying, Yuguan, Niutouya, Shimenzhai, Taiying, Daxinzhai, Zhucaoying, Duzhuang

Townships:
Chapeng Township, Shenhe Township

Lulong County
Towns:
Lulong, Panzhuang, Yanheying, Shuangwang, Liutiangezhuang, Shimen

Townships:
Xiazhai Township, Liujiaying Township, Chenguantun Township, Yinzhuang Township, Gebo Township, Mujing Township

Qinglong Manchu Autonomous County
Towns:
Qinglong, Zushan, Mutoudeng, Shuangshanzi, Maquanzi, Xiaoyingzi, Dawulan, Tumenzi, Badaohe, Gehetou, Louzhangzi

Townships:
Fenghuangshan Township, Longwangmiao Township, Sanxingkou Township, Gangou Township, Dashiling Township, Guanchang Township, Ciyushan Township, Pingfangzi Township, Anziling Township, Zhuzhangzi Township, Caonian Township, Qidaohe Township, Sanbozi Township, Liangshuihe Township

Tangshan

Caofeidian District
Towns:
Tanghai, Binhai, Liuzan

Fengnan District
Subdistricts:
Xugezhuang Subdistrict

Towns:
Fengnan Town, Daodi, Qianying, Tangfang, Huanggezhuang, Xige, Xiaoji, Wanglanzhuang, Daxinzhuang, Liushuquan, Heiyanzi, Daqigezhuang

Townships:
Nansunzhuang Township, Dongtianzhuang Township, Jianzigu Township

There is the Tangshan Nanbao Development Zone

Fengrun District
Subdistricts:
Taiping Road Subdistrict, Yanshan Road Subdistrict, Gengyang Subdistrict

Towns:
Fengrun Town, Laozhuangzi, Rengezhuang, Zuojiawu, Quanhetou, Wangguanying, Huoshiying, Hancheng, Chahe, Xinjuntun, Xiaozhanggezhuang, Fengdengwu, Lizhaozhuang, Baiguantun, Shigezhuang, Shaliuhe, Qishuzhuang, Yangguanlin

Townships:
Jiangjiaying Township, Huanxizhuang Township, Yinchengpu Township, Liujiaying Township, Changzhuang Township

Guye District
Subdistricts:
Tangjiazhuang Subdistrict, Zhaogezhuang Subdistrict, Linxi Subdistrict, Guye Subdistrict, Nanfangezhuang Subdistrict, Lüjiatuo Subdistrict

Townships:
Wangnianzhuang Township, Beijiadian Township, Fangezhuang Township, Dazhuangtuo Township, Xijiatao Township

Kaiping District
Subdistricts:
Kaiping Subdistrict, Doudian Subdistrict, Jinggezhuang Mining District Subdistrict, Majiagou Subdistrict, Shuiwuzhuang Subdistrict

Towns:
Kaiping Town, Liyuan, Zhengzhuangzi, Shuangqiao, Wali, Yuehe

Lubei District
Subdistricts:
Qiaotun Subdistrict, Wenhua Road Subdistrict, Diaoyutai Subdistrict, Dongxincun Subdistrict, Gangyao Subdistrict, Jichang Road Subdistrict, Hebei Road Subdistrict, Longdong Subdistrict, Dali Subdistrict, Guangming Subdistrict, Xiangyun Subdistrict
The only township is Guoyuan Township

Tangshan New Technology Development Zone

Lunan District
Subdistricts:
Youyili Subdistrict, South Xueyuan Road Subdistrict, Guangchang Subdistrict, Yonghongqiao Subdistrict, Xiaoshan Subdistrict, Wenhuabeihou Avenue Subdistrict, Qianjiaying Mining District Subdistrict

The only township is Nüzhizhai Township

Qian'an
Towns:
Qian'an, Xiaguanying, Yanggezhuang, Jianchangying, Zhaodianzi, Yajituo, Dacuizhuang, Yangdianzi, Caiyuan, Malanzhuang, Shaheyi, Muchangkou

Townships:
Kouzhuang Township, Pengdianzi Township, Shangsheyanzhuang Township, Yanjiadian Township, Wuchong'an Township, Dawuli Township, Taipingzhuang Township

Zunhua
Towns:
Zunhua Town, Baozidian, Malanyu, Ping'ancheng, Dongxinzhuang, Xindianzi, Dangyu, Dibeitou, Dongjiuzhai, Tiechang, Sujiawa, Jianming, Shimen

Townships:
Xiliucun Township, Cuijiazhuang Township, Xingwangzhai Township, Liubeizhai Township, Tuanpiaozhuang Township, Niangniangzhuang Township, Xisanli Township, Houjiazhai Township, Xiaochang Township, Xiaxiaying Manchu Ethnic Township, Tangquan Manchu Ethnic Township, Dongling Manchu Ethnic Township

Laoting County
Subdistricts:
Chengqu Subdistrict

Towns:
Laoting, Tangjiahe, Hujiatuo, Wangtan, Yangezhuang, Matouying, Xinzhai, Tingliuhe, Jianggezhuang, Maozhuang, Zhongbao

Townships:
Panggezhuang Township, Daxianggezhuang Township, Guhe Township

Luan County
Towns:
Luanzhou, Xiangtang, Dong'angezhuang, Leizhuang, Ciyutuo, Bangzi, Yangliuzhuang, Youzha, Guma, Xiaomazhuang, Jiubaihu, Wangdianzi

Luannan County
Towns:
Bencheng, Songdaokou, Changning, Hugezhuang, Tuoli, Yaowangzhuang, Sigezhuang, Angezhuang, Bachigang, Chengzhuang, Qingtuoying, Baigezhuang, Nanbao, Fanggezhuang, Donghuangtuo, Macheng

Qianxi County
The only subdistrict is Lixiang Subdistrict

Towns:
Xingcheng, Jinchangyu, Saheqiao, Taipingzhai, Luojiatun, Dongmangyu, Xinji, Santunying, Luanyang

Townships:
Baimiaozi Township, Shangying Township, Han'erzhuang Township, Yuhuzhai Township, Jiucheng Township, Yinzhuang Township, Donglianhuayuan Township, Xinzhuangzi Township

Yutian County
Towns:
Yutian, Liangjiadian, Yahongqiao, Woluogu, Shijiuwo, Hongqiao, Sanshuitou, Linnancang, Linxi, Yangjiabanqiao, Caitingqiao, Gushu, Da'an, Tangzitou

Townships:
Guojiatun Township, Lintoutun Township, Yangjiatao Township, Chaoluowo Township, Chenjiapu Township, Guojiaqiao Township

Xingtai

Qiaodong District, Xingtai
Subdistricts:
Nanchang Avenue Subdistrict, Beida Avenue Subdistrict, Xida Avenue Subdistrict, Ximenli Subdistrict

The only town is Dongguocun, and the only township is Daliangzhuang Township.

Qiaoxi District, Xingtai
Subdistricts:
Gangtie Road Subdistrict, Zhongxing Road Subdistrict, Dahuoquan Subdistrict, Zhangkuan Subdistrict, Zhangcun Subdistrict, Zhonghua Avenue Subdistrict, Tuanjie Road Subdistrict, Quanxi Subdistrict

Towns:
Nandaguo, Licun Township

Nangong
Subdistricts:
Fenggang Subdistrict, Nandu Subdistrict, Beihu Subdistrict, Xiding Subdistrict

Towns:
Sucun, Dagaocun, Chuiyang, Minghua, Duanlutou, Qianzizhong

Townships:
Dacun Township, Nanbiancun Township, Datun Township, Wangdaozhai Township, Xuewucun Township

Shahe
Subdistricts:
Dalian Subdistrict, Qiaodong Subdistrict, Qiaoxi Subdistrict, Zanshan Subdistrict, Zhouzhuang Subdistrict

Towns:
Shahecheng, Xincheng, Baita, Shiliting, Qicun

Townships:
Liucun Township, Cejing Township, Liushigang Township, Chaiguan Township, Chanfang Township

Baixiang County
Towns:
Baixiang, Guchengdian, Xiwang

Townships:
Wangjiazhuang Township, Neibu Township, Longhua Township

Guangzong County
The only town is Guangzong

Townships:
Dapingtai Township, Dongzhao Township, Jianzhi Township, Hetaoyuan Township, Hulu Township, Beitangtuan Township, Fengjiazhai Township

Julu County
Towns:
Julu, Wanghuzhai, Xiguocheng, Guanting, Yantuan, Xiaolüzhai

Townships:
Ticun Township, Zhangwangtuan Township, Guanzhai Township, Sujiaying Township

Lincheng County
Towns:
Lincheng, Dongzhen, Xishu, Haozhuang

Townships:
Heicheng Township, Yageying Township, Shicheng Township, Zhaozhuang Township

Linxi County
Towns:
Linxi, Hexi, Xiabaosi, Jianzhong, Laoguanzhai

Townships:
Lüzhai Township, Yao'anzhen Township, Daliuzhuang Township, Dongzaoyuan Township

Longyao County
Towns:
Longyao, Weijiazhuang, Yincun, Shankou, Lianzi, Gucheng

Townships:
Beilou Township, Dongliang Township, Shuangbei Township, Niujiaqiao Township, Qianhuying Township, Dazhangzhuang Township

Nanhe County
Towns:
Heyang, Jiasong, Haoqiao

Townships:
Dongsanzhao Township, Yanli Township, Heguo Township, Shizhao Township, Sansi Township

Neiqiu County
Towns:
Neiqiu, Damengcun, Jindian, Guanzhuang, Liulin

Townships:
Wuguodian Township, Nanzhai Township, Zhangmao Township, Houjiazhuang Township

Ningjin County
Towns:
Fenghuang, Hequ, Beihezhuang, Gengzhuangqiao, Dongwang, Jiajiakou, Sizhilan, Dalucun, Sujiazhuang, Huanmadian

Townships:
Houkou Township, Jichangzhuang Township, Tangqiu Township, Beiyu Township, Xujiahe Township, Dacaozhuang Township

Pingxiang County
Towns:
Fengzhou, Hegumiao, Pingxiang

Townships:
Youzhao Township, Jiegu Township, Tianfucun Township, Xunzhao Township

Qinghe County
Towns:
Gexianzhuang, Lianzhuang, Youfang, Xielu, Wangguanzhuang, Baying

Ren County
Towns:
Rencheng, Xingjiawan, Xindian

Townships:
Luozhuang Township, Tiankou Township, Datun Township, Yongfuzhuang Township, Xigucheng Township

Wei County, Xingtai
Towns:
Mingzhou, Liyuantun, Zhangtai, Houguan, Qiji

Townships:
Fangjiaying Township, Dishiying Township, Zaoyuan Township, Guxian Township, Hezhao Township, Heying Township, Zhangying Township, Changtun Township, Changzhuang Township, Gaogongzhuang Township, Zhaocun Township

Xingtai County
Subdistricts:
Yurangqiao Subdistrict

Towns:
Dongwang, Wangkuai, Zhucun, Yanjiatun, Nanshimen, Yangfan, Huangsi, Huining, Xihuangcun, Luluo, Jiangjunmu, Jiangshui, Songjiazhuang

Townships:
Taizijing Township, Longquansi Township, Beixiaozhuang Township, Chengjitou Township, Bai'an Township, Jijiacun Township

Xinhe County
Towns:
Xinhe, Xunzhai

Townships:
Baishenshou Township, Jingjiazhuang Township, Xiliu Township, Renrangli Township

Zhangjiakou

Qiaodong District, Zhangjiakou
Subdistricts:
Hongqilou Subdistrict, North Shengli Road Subdistrict, Wuyi Avenue Subdistrict, Huayuan Avenue Subdistrict, Zuanshi Road Subdistrict, Nanzhan Subdistrict, Maludong Subdistrict

Towns:
Laoyazhuang, Yaojiazhuang

Qiaoxi District, Zhangjiakou
Subdistricts:
South Mingde Avenue Subdistrict, Dahuanmen Subdistrict, North Mingde Avenue Subdistrict, Xinhua Avenue Subdistrict, Baozili Subdistrict, Nanyingfang Subdistrict, Gongren New Village Subdistrict

Towns:
Dongyaozi, Shenjiatun

Xiahuayuan District
Subdistricts:
Chengzhen Subdistrict, Meikuang Subdistrict

Townships:
Huayuan Township, Xinzhuangzi Township, Dingfangshui Township, Duanjiabao Township

Xuanhua District
Subdistricts:
Tianqinsi Subdistrict, Huangcheng Subdistrict, Nanguan Subdistrict, Nanda Avenue Subdistrict, Zhangjiakou, Dabei Avenue Subdistrict, Gongye Avenue Subdistrict, Jianguo Avenue Subdistrict

The only town is Pangjiabao

Townships:
Hezixi Township, Chunguang Township, Houjiamiao Township

Chicheng County
Towns:
Chicheng, Tianjiayao, Longguan, Diao'e, Dushikou, Baicao, Longmensuo, Houcheng, Dongmao

Townships:
Paoliang Township, Dahaituo Township, Zhenningbao Township, Maying Township, Yunzhou Township, Sandaochuan Township, Dongwankou Township, Ciyingzi Township, Yangtian Township

Chongli County
Towns:
Xiwanzi, Gaojiaying

Townships:
Sitaizui Township, Hongzuying Township, Shiyaozi Township, Yimatu Township, Shizuizi Township, Shizigou Township, Qingsanying Township, Baiqi Township

Guyuan County
Towns:
Pingdingbao, Xiaochang, Huangshandiao, Jiuliancheng

Townships:
Gaoshanbao Township, Xiaohezi Township, Erdaoqu Township, Da'erhao Hui Ethnic Township, Shandianhe Township, Changliang Township, Fengyuandian Township, Xixinying Township, Lianhuatan Township, Baituyao Township

Huai'an County
Towns:
Chaigoubu, Zuowei, Toubaihu, Huai'ancheng

Townships:
Dukoubao Township, Diliutun Township, Xiwanbao Township, Sishacheng Township, Taipingzhuang Township, Wanghutun Township, Disanbao Township

Huailai County
Towns:
Shacheng, Beixinbao, Xinbao'an, Donghuayuan, Guanting, Sangyuan, Cunrui, Tumu, Dahuangzhuang, Xibali, Xiaonanxinbao

Townships:
Langshan Township, Jijiyi Township, Dongbali Township, Ruiyunguan Township, Sunzhuangzi Township, Wangjialou Hui Ethnic Township

Kangbao County
Towns:
Kangbao, Zhangji, Tuchengzi, Dengyoufang, Lijiadi, Zhaoyanghe, Tunken

Townships:
Geyoufang Township, Danqinghe Township, Habiga Township, Erhaobu Township, Lujiaying Township, Zhongyi Township, Chuchangdi Township, Mandetang Township

Shangyi County
Towns:
Nanhaoqian, Daqinggou, Badaogou, Hongtuliang, Xiaosuangou, Sangongdi

Townships:
Dayingpan Township, Dasuji Township, Shijing Township, Kangleng Township, Qijia Township, Taolizhuang Township, Jiashihe Township, Xiamaquan Township

Wanquan County
Towns:
Kongjiazhuang, Wanquan, Ximalin, Guoleizhuang

Townships:
Shanfangbao Township, Beixintun Township, Xuanpingbao Township, Gaomiaobao Township, Jiubao Township, Anjiabao Township, Beishacheng Township

Xuanhua County
Towns:
Yanghenan, Shenjing, Guocun, Shalingzi, Yaojiafang, Dacangshan, Jiajiaying, Gujiaying, Zhaochuan

Townships:
Wangjiawan Township, Ta'ercun Township, Jiangjiatun Township, Dongwangshan Township, Lijiabao Township

Yangyuan County
Towns:
Xicheng, Dongcheng, Huashaoying, Chuaihuatuan, Dongjingji

Townships:
Yaojiazhuang Township, Dongfangchengbao Township, Jing'ergou Township, Sanmafang Township, Gaoqiang Township, Datianwa Township, Xinbao Township, Maquanbao Township, Futujiang Township

Yu County
Towns:
Yuzhou, Daiwangcheng, Xiheying, Jijiazhuang, Baile, Nuanquan, Nanliuzhuang, Beishuiquan, Taohua, Yangjuan, Songjiazhuang

Townships:
Xiagongcun Township, Nanyangzhuang Township, Baishu Township, Changning Township, Yongquanzhuang Township, Yangzhuangke Township, Nanlingzhuang Township, Chenjiawa Township, Huangmei Township, Baicaocunc Township, Caogoubao Township

Zhangbei County
Towns:
Zhangbei, Gonghui, Ertai, Dahulun

Townships:
Tailugou Township, Youlougou Township, Mantouying Township, Erquanjing Township, Danjinghe Township, Dahe Township, Hailiutu Township, Liangmianjing Township, Haojiaying Township, Baimiaotan Township, Xiao'ertai Township, Zhanhai Township, Sanhao Township, Huangshiya Township

Zhuolu County
The county-administered district is Nanshan District

Towns:
Zhuolu, Zhangjiabao, Wujiagou, Wubao, Baodai, Fanshan, Dabao, Hedong, Dongxiaozhuang, Dahenan, Huiyao

Townships:
Luanzhuang Township, Wenquantun Township, Heishansi Township, Wofosi Township, Xiejiabao Township, Mangshikou Township

References

External links

 
Hebei
Townships